is the fifth opening theme song from the Japanese anime Kirarin Revolution. The song was released as Kirari Tsukishima's fourth single, who Kusumi portrays in the show.

Background and release

"Chance!" is the fifth opening theme song to Kirarin Revolution and is performed by Koharu Kusumi from Morning Musume, who voices the main character, Kirari Tsukishima.

The limited edition of single was released on November 7, 2007 under the Zetima label, while the regular edition was released on November 28, 2007. "Ramutara", the eighth ending theme song to Kirarin Revolution, was included as a B-side and is also performed by Kusumi under her character's name.

The limited edition featured an alternate cover and an exclusive version of Takara Tomy's paper doll Millefeui Card from Kirarin Revolution, while the first press bonus for the regular edition came with a large sticker.

A video single, referred as a "Single V", was released on December 10, 2007.

Music video

The music video was directed by Toshiyuki Suzuki and features Kusumi dressed up as Kirari Tsukishima. A key feature in the video's art direction and choreography is when Kusumi pulls apart her dress after the instrumental break to reveal a long, red dress underneath.

Reception

The CD single debuted at #9 in the Oricon Weekly Singles Chart and charted for 11 weeks. The video single charted at #33 on the Oricon Weekly DVD Charts and charted for 2 weeks.

Track listing

Single

DVD single

Charts

Single

DVD single

Notes

References 

2007 singles
2007 songs
Anime songs
Children's television theme songs
Hello! Project songs
Kirarin Revolution
Songs written by Tetsurō Oda
Animated series theme songs